The Women's 5000 metres at the 2000 Summer Olympics as part of the athletics programme was held at Stadium Australia on Friday 22 September, and Sunday 25 September 2000. The top four runners in each of the initial three heats automatically qualified for the final. The next three fastest runners from across the heats also qualified. There were a total number of 50 participating athletes.

Records

Medals

Results
All times shown are in seconds.
 Q denotes qualification by place in heat.
 q denotes qualification by overall place.
 DNS denotes did not start.
 DNF denotes did not finish.
 DQ denotes disqualification.
 NR denotes national record.
 OR denotes Olympic record.
 WR denotes world record.
 PB denotes personal best.
 SB denotes season best.

Heats

Overall Results Semi-Finals

Final

References

External links
 Official Report
 Official Report of the 2000 Sydney Summer Olympics

 
5000 metres at the Olympics
2000 in women's athletics
Women's events at the 2000 Summer Olympics